Caesium superoxide is the superoxide of caesium. It is an orange solid.

Preparation 
Burning caesium in excess oxygen will produce caesium superoxide.

Properties 
Caesium superoxide's crystal structure is same as calcium carbide. It contains direct oxygen-oxygen bonding.

It reacts with water to form hydrogen peroxide and caesium hydroxide.

The standard enthalpy of formation ΔHf0 of caesium superoxide is −295 kJ/mol.

Caesium superoxide reacts with ozone to form caesium ozonide.

References 

Caesium compounds
Superoxides